The 1972 European Figure Skating Championships was a senior-level international competition held at the Scandinavium in Gothenburg, Sweden on January 11–15. Elite senior-level figure skaters from European ISU member nations competed for the title of European Champion in the disciplines of men's singles, ladies' singles, pair skating, and ice dancing.

Overview
The 1970 European bronze medalist, Günter Zöller, arrived in Gothenburg with the East German team but withdrew before the start of the event after going to the West German embassy to defect.

In the men's event, the top three after the compulsory figures held their placements for the medals. Ondrej Nepela completed triple salchow and toe loop jumps and finished first ahead of Sergei Chetverukhin, who skated with power, flow, and elegance but fell on a triple salchow attempt. Patrick Péra won the bronze medal with no triples at all. Yuri Ovchinnikov placed second in the free skating but was unable to move up to the podium after placing seventh in figures.

The ladies' title was again won by defending champion Beatrix Schuba, who built up such an overwhelming lead in the compulsory figures that she won by a huge margin despite placing 5th in the free skating. Afterwards a German newspaper mocked her as the "Champion Without a Double Axel". Rita Trapanese took the silver medal, while Sonja Morgenstern moved up to bronze medal position after winning the free skating with a performance for which she received a 6.0 mark for artistic impression.

In the pairs event, Irina Rodnina / Alexei Ulanov also successfully defended their title in spite of some small mistakes. Liudmila Smirnova / Andrei Suraikin won the silver with a performance that was considered more artistic, if less difficult, than that of the winners. The third-place team, Manuela Groß / Uwe Kagelmann, included two throw double axels in their free skating, which at that time was one of the most difficult elements attempted by pair skaters, and unusual enough to draw comment. As Gross was only 14 years old at this time while her partner Kagelmann was a tall grown man of 21, they were one of the first of what later became known as "one-and-a-half" or "flea-and-gorilla" pair teams.

The dance event was the only discipline in which the title changed hands, as Angelika and Erich Buck unseated the defending champions Lyudmila Pakhomova / Alexander Gorshkov. The bronze medal went to the veteran British competitor Janet Sawbridge, now skating with Peter Dalby. It was Sawbridge's sixth medal at the European championships, achieved with three different partners.

Results

Men

Ladies

Pairs

Ice dancing

References

External links
 results

European Figure Skating Championships, 1972
European Figure Skating Championships, 1972
European Figure Skating Championships
International figure skating competitions hosted by Sweden
International sports competitions in Gothenburg
1970s in Gothenburg
European Figure Skating Championships, 1972